Hantzsch is a surname. Notable people with the surname include:

 Arthur Rudolf Hantzsch (1857–1935), German chemist
 Hantzsch–Widman nomenclature, type of systematic chemical nomenclature for naming heterocyclic parent hydrides
 Hantzsch pyridine synthesis, multi-component organic reaction between an aldehyde a β-keto ester and a nitrogen donor
 Hantzsch pyrrole synthesis, the chemical reaction of β-ketoesters with ammonia and α-haloketones to give substituted pyrroles
 Bernhard Hantzsch (1875–1911), German ornithologist, Arctic researcher and writer, who discovered two Icelandic bird subspecies
 Hantzsch Island, uninhabited island in the Qikiqtaaluk Region of Nunavut, Canada named after Bernhard Hantzsch

See also
 Tzsch

German-language surnames